Mmuock, also called Mmock in some regions, is the language of the Mmuock (Mmock) people of western Cameroon. A writing system is based on the Latin script.

Mmuock is a tonal language: the phrase a fa lèlā can mean at least four different things depending on the tone on the second 〈a〉:
 a fǎ lèlā. she has been wrong to cry
 a fâ lèlā. she will be wrong to cry
 a fȧ lèlā. she [when she wants, or has, to] makes the mistake of crying
 a fă lèlā. she [as is in her nature] makes the mistake of crying.

Orthography 
The Mmuock alphabet referenced herein has notations for fifteen tones and forty letters.

Keyboard layouts 
Some Unix-like operating systems such as Linux provide an XKB keyboard layout for the Mmuock alphabet. The keyboard layout is a variant of the layout for Cameroon English.

Under Microsoft Windows, Android, the iPhone and iPad, a keyboard layout is available that uses Keyman keyboard layouts.

Sample phrases 
 Welcome
 Zàlèsǣh (to one person)
 Peì zàlèsǣh (to more than one person)
 Enjoy your stay
 Zàlènáng (to one person)
 Peì zàlènáng (to more than one person)
 How do you do?
 À la ká? (to a non-elder)
 What’s up? (casual)
 Ǹgálé?

 Bon appetit / Have a nice meal
 À tsá Ńtsēr
 Bon voyage / Have a good journey
 Qei lènda (to one person)
 Peì qéí lènda (to more than one person)
 Thank you
 M nkongtè wúó (to one person)
 M nkongtè wéí (to more than one person)
 Thanks!
 M nkongte̋

References

External links 
 The Mmuock Keyboard
Languages of Cameroon